Laurenţiu Mocanu (born June 2, 1986), better known by his stage name Guess Who is a Romanian rapper.

Early life and career
Guess Who (Laurenţiu Mocanu) was born in Bucharest, Romania in 1986. As a child, he enjoyed sports and even played football for the Bucharest-based club Steaua.

Mocanu was also chosen by Disney to provide the Romanian voice of one of Ratigan acolytes from the animated movie The Great Mouse Detective.

Discography
Hai Să Vorbim (Let's Talk) (with Anonim) (2005)
Probe Audio (Sound Check) (2009)
Tot Mai Sus (Higher) (2011)
Un Anonim Celebru (A Famous Anonymous) (2017)

References

1986 births
Living people
Romanian rappers
Musicians from Bucharest